These are all the matches played by the Macedonia national football team from 1993 to 2018:

1993

Summary

Matches

1994

Summary

Matches

1995

Summary

Matches

1996

Summary

Matches

1997

Summary

Matches

1998

Summary

Matches

1999

Summary

Matches

2000

Summary

Matches

2001

Summary

Matches

2002

Summary

Matches

2003

Summary

Matches

2004

Summary

Matches

2005

Summary

Matches

2006

Summary

Matches

2007

Summary

Matches

2008

Summary

Matches

2009

Summary

Matches

2010

Summary

Matches

2011

Summary

Matches

2012

Summary

Matches

2013

Summary

Matches

2014

Summary

Matches

2015

Summary

Matches

2016

Summary

Matches

2017

Summary

Matches

2018

Summary

Matches

Notes

References

External links
EU-Football – international football match results of Macedonia 1993-present
RSSSF archive of results
FIFA.com – Macedonia: Fixtures and Results
World Referee – Matches featuring Macedonia

1993-2018